is a Japanese footballer currently playing as a defender for Veertien Mie.

Career statistics

Club
.

Notes

References

External links

1994 births
Living people
Association football people from Chiba Prefecture
Takushoku University alumni
Japanese footballers
Association football defenders
Japan Football League players
J3 League players
Vanraure Hachinohe players
Veertien Mie players
21st-century Japanese people